The Indian paisa(plural: paise) is a  (one-hundredth) subdivision of the Indian rupee. The paisa was first introduced on 1 April 1957 after decimalisation of the Indian rupee.

In 1955, the Government of India first amended the Indian Coinage Act and adopted the "metric system for coinage". From 1957 to 1964, the paisa was called naya paisa and on 1 June 1964, the term "naya" was dropped and the denomination was named paisa. Paisa has been issued in 1, 2, 3, 5, 10, 20, 25, and 50 paise coins. Though as of 2023, coins of denomination of 1 rupee are the lowest value in use.

History

Prior to 1957, Indian rupee was not decimalised and the rupee from 1835 to 1957 was further divided into 16 annas. Each anna was further divided to four Indian pices and each pice into three Indian pies till 1947 when the pie was demonetised.

Coins

Naya paisa series (19571964)

Paisa series (19642009)

Mint mark

 No mintmark = Kolkata
 ⧫ = Mumbai mint
 B = Mumbai Proof issues
 * = Hyderabad
 ° = Noida

See also
Paisa
History of the rupee

References

External links 

Coins of India
Historical currencies of India